Green Mind is the fourth studio album by alternative rock band Dinosaur Jr., released in 1991. It was the band's first release after bassist Lou Barlow's departure, as well as the first released by a major label. The record is close to being a J Mascis solo album: he played most of the instruments, with founding drummer Murph only featuring on three tracks (1, 7 and 9).

The cover photograph, Priscilla, Jones Beach, 1969, is by Joseph Szabo and taken from his book of photographs Almost Grown.

"Turnip Farm" is also featured in the film Reality Bites.

Reception

From contemporary reviews, Select gave the album a four out of five rating, describing the album as a "relief...not a bolt from a sky" and that "we're still waiting for Dinosaur Jr.'s masterpiece." Ralph Traitor of Sounds declared the album as "Dinosaur Jr have given us two great sides of born innocent modern punk." Graeme Kay in Q Magazine commented that the album should "consolidate their reputation as purveyors of quality hardcore." 

From retrospective reviews, Drowned in Sounds Chris Power called the album expansive.

Track listing
All songs written by J Mascis, except where noted.

Personnel
Dinosaur Jr.
J Mascis - vocals, guitar, bass, drums, producer
Murph - drums (tracks 1, 7, 9)
with:
Joe Harvard - guitar, tape (track 8)
Jay Spiegel - large drum, tambourine (track 5), tom-tom (track 1)
Don Fleming - guitar, backing vocals (track 1), acoustic bass (track 5)
Sean Slade - engineer, mellotron (tracks 7, 9)
Tom Walters - assistant engineer
Matt Dillon - backing vocals (track 11)

Charts
Album - Billboard (United States)

Singles - Billboard (United States)

References

Sources
 

1991 albums
Dinosaur Jr. albums
Sire Records albums
Blanco y Negro Records albums